Following the Flag in Mexico (also known in the US as Following Villa in Mexico) is a 1916 silent documentary film about the Mexican Revolution.

Production
The movie was partly filmed at locations in Mexico, Texas and New Mexico.

Cast
 Pancho Villa as himself
 Venustiano Carranza as himself
 Frederick Funston as himself
 John J. Pershing as himself

External links 
 

1916 films
Mexican Revolution films
Documentary films about Mexico
American silent feature films
American black-and-white films
American documentary films
1916 documentary films
1910s American films